The Republic of China (ROC), commonly known as "Nationalist China" or "Taiwan", supported South Vietnam (Republic of Vietnam) during the Vietnam War. Both were anti-communist Asian nations fighting against rival communist regimes, the People's Republic of China and North Vietnam (Democratic Republic of Vietnam).

From November 1967, the ROC secretly operated a cargo transport detachment to assist the US and the ROV. It was based on existing formation of the 34th squadron of ROC Air force. The unit's strength included two cargo aircraft, seven flight officers and two mechanics, even though a higher number of military personnel was involved through rotation. It was tasked with air transportation, airdrop and electronic reconnaissance. Some 25 members of the unit were killed, among them 17 pilots and co-pilots, and three aircraft were lost. Other ROC involvement in Vietnam included a secret listening station, special reconnaissance and raiding squads, military advisers and civilian airline operations (which cost a further two aircraft due to Vietnamese individually operated AA missiles).

The ROC also provided military training units for the South Vietnamese diving units.  The ROC trained units would eventually become the Lien Doi Nguoi Nhai (LDMN) or Frogman unit in English. In addition to the diving trainers there were several hundred military personnel.  Military commandos from the ROC were captured by communist forces three times, on 16 July 1961, July 1963 and again on 23 October 1963, trying to infiltrate North Vietnam.17 commandos were made prisoners during this time. 

The island of Taiwan was a popular R&R location for US military service members.

See also 
 Kuomintang in Burma

References

Bibliography

Vietnam War
Taiwan–Vietnam relations
South Vietnam–Taiwan relations
Military history of Taiwan
Foreign relations of Taiwan